Lambis Manthos (born 30 January 1934) is a Greek former sports shooter. He competed at four Olympic Games.

References

External links
 

1934 births
Living people
Greek male sport shooters
Olympic shooters of Greece
Shooters at the 1964 Summer Olympics
Shooters at the 1968 Summer Olympics
Shooters at the 1972 Summer Olympics
Shooters at the 1976 Summer Olympics
People from Ioannina (regional unit)
Sportspeople from Epirus (region)
20th-century Greek people